Middledrift, officially known as iXesi (in Xhosa) and also known as Middeldrift (in Afrikaans), is a small town located  north-west of East London in the Eastern Cape province of South Africa. It is situated in Raymond Mhlaba Municipality in Amathole District in an area that was formerly part of the Ciskei.

The town is on the Keiskamma River, 45 km west-north-west of King William's Town and 16 km east-south-east of Alice. It was founded in 1853 and laid out in 1882. At first known as Beaconsfield, it was renamed after its situation at a ford (Dutch: drift) between two others. Due to corruption and mismanagement of funds it has become a wasteland and most of the residents nearby have to travel to Alice for shopping and services. The town is the birth place of anti-apartheid activist Wilton Mkwayi,advocate Bulelani Ngcuka and scientist Dr Vatiswa Papu Zamxaka.

References

Populated places in the Raymond Mhlaba Local Municipality